Manuel Dias the Younger (1574– 4 March 1659) was a Portuguese Jesuit missionary.

Name
Manuel Dias the Younger acquired his epithet to distinguish him from Manuel Dias the Elder (–1639). He is also known as Emanuel or Emmanuel Diaz. His name was sinified as Yang Manuo, and he was also referred to by his courtesy name Yanxi (演西).

Life
Dias arrived in China in 1610, reaching Beijing in 1613. He introduced the telescope into China just a few years after it had been developed in the Netherlands (1608). The telescope was first mentioned in his Tian Wen Lüe (Explicatio Sphaerae Coelestis) in 1615.  In the Tian Wen Lüe he presented the latest European astronomical knowledge in the form of questions and answers. The book was studied and published until the 19th century.

See also
 Wenceslas Pantaleon Kirwitzer

References

Citations

Bibliography
 
 Liam Matthew Brockey, "Journey to the East: the Jesuit mission to China, 1579–1724", Harvard University Press, 2007, 
 Joseph Needham, "Chinese astronomy and the Jesuit mission: an encounter of cultures", China Society, 1958
 Francisco Rodrigues, "Jesuitas portugueses astrónomos na China, 1583–1805", Tipografia Porto Medico, 1925
 Joseph Needham, Ling Wang, "Science and Civilisation in China", 

1574 births
1659 deaths
People from Castelo Branco, Portugal
17th-century Portuguese Jesuits
Portuguese expatriates in China
Portuguese explorers
Astronomy in China
Jesuit missionaries in China
16th-century astronomers
Portuguese Roman Catholic missionaries
Roman Catholic missionaries in China
Jesuit missionaries
Jesuit scientists